Contemporary Psychoanalysis is a quarterly academic journal for the dissemination of psychoanalytic ideas.

For decades, the journal, which was founded in 1964, was the only one to publish articles from all schools of psychoanalysis, including interpersonal, relational, Freudian, Jungian, and Object Relations. It also publishes empirical research about human development and unconscious process.

The current editors-in-chief are Ruth Livingston and Susan Fabrick.

The journal has featured articles on interpersonal processes and intersubjectivity by authors such as Stephen Mitchell, Harold Searles, Edgar Levenson, Benjamin Wolstein, Joyce McDougall, Philip Bromberg, Irwin Hoffman, Jessica Benjamin, Silvano Arieti, Darlene Ehrenberg, Donnel Stern, and James Grotstein. It has published articles on psychoanalytic perspectives on prejudice due to race, sexuality, and religion. There have been discussions of contemporary psychodynamic approaches to depression from the perspective of the patient and clinician.

The journal is owned by the William Alanson White Institute and Society.

References

External links
William Alanson White Institute
Contemporary Psychoanalysis

Psychoanalysis journals
Publications established in 1964
Quarterly journals
Psychoanalysis in the United States